Rhinella castaneotica is a species of toad in the family Bufonidae. It is known from the Amazon Basin in Bolivia (Pando), Brazil (Amazonas, Pará, and Rondônia), Colombia (Amazonas, Caquetá, and Putumayo), and eastern Peru, but likely occurs wider in the upper Amazon Basin. Its natural habitats are tropical moist old-growth lowland forests. It is a forest floor species that breeds in Brazil nut capsules and temporary pools. There are no known significant threats to this species.

References

castaneotica
Amphibians of Bolivia
Amphibians of Brazil
Amphibians of Colombia
Amphibians of Peru
Amphibians described in 1991
Taxonomy articles created by Polbot
Taxa named by Janalee P. Caldwell